Prenga is a surname. Notable people with this surname include:

 Besnik Prenga (born 1969), Albanian football player
 Herdi Prenga (born 1994), Albanian-Croatian football player
 Ledjana Prenga (born 1997), Albanian reality television contestant
 Armando Prenga, member of the Socialist Party of Albania